Touiref is a town and commune in the Kef Governorate, Tunisia. As of 2004 it had a population of 2,895.

See also
List of cities in Tunisia

References

Populated places in Tunisia
Communes of Tunisia